The following outline is provided as an overview of and topical guide to the discipline of sociology:

Sociology – the study of society using various methods of empirical investigation and critical analysis to understand human social activity, from the micro level of individual agency and interaction to the macro level of systems and social structure.

Nature of sociology

Definition 
Sociology can be described as all of the following:

 The study of society.
 Academic discipline – body of knowledge given to - or received by - a disciple (student); a branch or sphere of knowledge, or field of study, that an individual has chosen to specialise in.
 Field of science  – widely recognized category of specialized expertise within science, and typically embodies its own terminology and nomenclature.  Such a field will usually be represented by one or more scientific journals, where peer reviewed research is published.  There are many sociology-related scientific journals.
 Social science  – field of academic scholarship that explores aspects of human society.

Essence of sociology

Overall 
Sociology

Key themes across sociological research  
Society 

Globalization
Human behavior
Human environmental impact
Identity
Industrial revolutions 3 & 4
Social complexity
Social environment
Social equality
Social equity
Social power
Social stratification
Social structure

Branches of sociology

Multidisciplinary and interdisciplinary fields involving sociology

History of sociology 

 History of sociology
 Timeline of sociology

Theoretical perspectives in sociology

Approaches

Positivism
Positivism (Empirical sociology)

Critical realist
Critical realism

Structural
Structuralism

Challenging structure

Social interactions

Behavioural
Psychoanalytic sociology

Social justice
Critical theory

Applied
Pure sociology

Ecological
Human ecology

Levels of analysis

Methodology and methods in sociology

General sociology concepts

Sociology by location

Sociologists 
 List of sociologists

Sociological publications 

Sociology journals 
Magazines

Sociology books

Sociological associations

Sociological associations

Academies

Related fields

See also

References

External links
 SocioSite, a directory of sociology resources
 Sections of American Sociological Association
 Research Committees and Themes of International Sociological Association, AIS
  Comités de Recherche de l'Association internationale des sociologues de langue française, AISLF
  Liste des réseaux thématiques de l'Association Française de Sociologie, AFS

Sociology
Sociology lists
Sociology